St. Elizabeth Academy was a private, Roman Catholic high school in St. Louis, Missouri.  It was located in the Roman Catholic Archdiocese of Saint Louis.

Background
St. Elizabeth Academy was established in 1882 by the Sisters of the most Precious Blood.

Closing in 2013
The Board of Directors announced on January 8, 2013 it would close the school due to declining enrollment rates.

Notes and references

External links
 School Website

Defunct Catholic secondary schools in Missouri
Educational institutions established in 1882
Educational institutions disestablished in 2013
Girls' schools in Missouri
Roman Catholic Archdiocese of St. Louis
1882 establishments in Missouri
2013 disestablishments in Missouri